The 1998–99 Washington State Cougars men's basketball team represented Washington State University for the 1998–99 NCAA Division I men's basketball season. Led by fifth-year head coach Kevin Eastman, the Cougars were members of the Pacific-10 Conference and played their home games on campus at Beasley Coliseum in Pullman, Washington.

Shortly after the regular season ended, Eastman voluntarily

References

External links
Sports Reference – Washington State Cougars: 1998–99 basketball season

Washington State Cougars men's basketball seasons
Washington State Cougars
Washington State
Washington State